Fernvale LRT station (SW5) is an elevated Light Rail Transit (LRT) station on the Sengkang LRT line West Loop in Fernvale, Sengkang, Singapore, next to The Seletar Mall near the junction of Fernvale Road and Sengkang West Avenue. It was opened on 29 January 2005 together with the Punggol LRT East Loop. Like Dover MRT station on the East West line, this station is one of few above ground stations that has two opposing side platforms. This station has a similar design to Sam Kee LRT station as it is not built on a road median. A major mall beside the station, The Seletar Mall, opened its doors to the public on 28 November 2014.

This station is the only station on the Sengkang/Punggol LRT line to have side platforms.

Etymology

The station is named after the road adjacent to it, Fernvale Road.

References

External links

Railway stations in Singapore opened in 2005
Fernvale, Singapore
LRT stations in Sengkang
Light Rail Transit (Singapore) stations